The 2010 İstanbul Cup was a women's tennis tournament played on outdoor hard courts. It was the 6th edition of the İstanbul Cup, and was part of the WTA International tournaments of the 2010 WTA Tour. It took place in Istanbul, Turkey, from 26 July through 1 August  2010. Anastasia Pavlyuchenkova won the singles title.

WTA entrants

Seeds

 Seedings are based on the rankings of July 19, 2010.

Other entrants
The following players received wildcards into the singles main draw
  Çağla Büyükakçay
  Başak Eraydın
  Pemra Özgen

The following players received entry from the qualifying draw:
  Marta Domachowska
  Bojana Jovanovski
  Ekaterina Makarova
  Julia Schruff

Finals

Singles

 Anastasia Pavlyuchenkova defeated  Elena Vesnina, 5–7, 7–5, 6–4
It was Pavlyuchenkova's second title of the year and career.

Doubles

''' Eleni Daniilidou /  Jasmin Wöhr defeated  Maria Kondratieva /  Vladimíra Uhlířová, 6–4, 1–6, [11–9]

References

External links
Official website

Istanbul Cup
İstanbul Cup
2010 in Turkish tennis
July 2010 sports events in Turkey
August 2010 sports events in Turkey